, also known by his Chinese style name , was a royal of Ryukyu Kingdom.

Tomigusuku Chōshun was the seventh head of a royal family called Tomigusuku Udun. He was the eldest son of Tomigusuku Chōkō. His rank was Aji at first. In 1831, he was appointed as sessei, and elevated to the rank Wōji, which was the highest rank among royals.

King Shō Iku dispatched a gratitude envoy for his taking power to Edo, Japan in 1832. However, he died in Kagoshima on 23 September 1832 (by the Japanese calendar, the 29th day, 8th month, of the year Tenpō-3). Futenma Chōten (also known by Shō Kan ) served as the political decoy of him, took his title "Prince Tomigusuku" and went to Edo. He buried in Kagoshima.

Prince Tomigusuku was father-in-law of King Shō Iku. He was also grandfather of King Shō Tai.

References

 

1832 deaths
Princes of Ryūkyū
Sessei
People of the Ryukyu Kingdom
Ryukyuan people
19th-century Ryukyuan people